Flower Town may refer to:

Flower Town, Kentucky, an unincorporated community in Pendleton County
Flower Town Station, a railway station in Sanda, Hyōgo Prefecture, Japan

See also
Flourtown, Pennsylvania, a census-designated place (CDP) in Montgomery County